Lavinia Stoddard (Stone; June 29, 1787 – November 8, 1820) was an American poet and school founder. Her poem, "The Soul's Defiance", was included in most of the anthologies published in the United States in the 19th-century.

Early life and education
Lavinia Stone was born in Guilford, Connecticut, June 29, 1787. While she was an infant, her father, Elijah Stone removed to Paterson, New Jersey, and here she received, besides the careful instructions of an intelligent and judicious mother, such education in the schools as was at the time common to the children of farmers.

Career
In 1811, she married Dr. William Stoddard, of Stratford, Connecticut. He was a graduate of Yale University in 1804; a graduate of the Medical School of the University of Pennsylvania in 1810, and a member of the Rensselaer County Medical Society in 1817.

In the then flourishing village of Troy, New York, on the Hudson River, the husband and wife established an academy, which they conducted successfully for several years. Here, they were friends of Francis Wayland, D.D., LL.D., afterwards of Brown University, and were both noticed in his memoir in an affectionate and complimentary way.

Stoddard wrote many poems, which were printed anonymously in the public journals, or addressed privately to her acquaintances. Her brother stated that the poem entitled "The Soul's Defiance" was interesting to her immediate friends for the truthfulness with which it portrayed her own experience and her indomitable spirit, which never floundered under any circumstances. This was written in a period of suffering and with a  sense of injury. It is the last of her compositions, and perhaps the best. It is included in most of the anthologies published in the United States in the 19th-century.

Personal life
Stoddard became ill with consumption, and about the year 1818, she removed with her family to Blakeley, Alabama, where Dr. Stoddard soon after died. Partially recovering her own health, she revisited Troy, but the severity of the climate induced her to return to Blakeley, where, she died within a year of her husband, Mrs. Stoddard's death probably hastened by grief for her husband. She died November 8, 1820, and was buried at the Blakeley Cemetery.

"The Soul's Defiance"
I SAID to Sorrow’s awful storm,	
That beat against my breast,	
Rage on—thou may’st destroy this form,	
And lay it low at rest;	
But still the spirit that now brooks
Thy tempest, raging high,	
Undaunted on its fury looks	
With steadfast eye.	

I said to Penury’s meagre train,	
Come on—your threats I brave;
My last poor life-drop you may drain,	
And crush me to the grave;	
Yet still the spirit that endures	
Shall mock your force the while,	
And meet each cold, cold grasp of yours
With bitter smile.	

I said to cold Neglect and Scorn,	
Pass on—I heed you not;	
Ye may pursue me till my form	
And being are forgot;
Yet still the spirit, which you see	
Undaunted by your wiles,	
Draws from its own nobility	
Its high-born smiles.	

I said to Friendship’s menaced blow,
Strike deep—my heart shall bear;	
Thou canst but add one bitter woe	
To those already there;	
Yet still the spirit that sustains	
This last severe distress
Shall smile upon its keenest pains,	
And scorn redress.	

I said to Death’s uplifted dart,	
Aim sure—oh, why delay?	
Thou wilt not find a fearful heart—
A weak, reluctant prey;	
For still the spirit, firm and free,	
Unruffled by this last dismay,	
Wrapt in its own eternity,	
Shall pass away.

References

Attribution

External links
 

1787 births
1820 deaths
19th-century American poets
19th-century American women writers
Writers from Connecticut
American women poets
Founders of schools in the United States
19th-century philanthropists